Xyrichtys wellingtoni, the Clipperton razorfish, is a species of marine ray-finned fish from the family Labridae, the wrasses. Found in the Eastern Central Pacific Ocean.  

Etymology
The fish is named in honor of marine biologist Gerard M. Wellington of the University of Houston. It was he who assisted with the collection of the type specimens.

References

wellingtoni
Taxa named by Gerald R. Allen
Taxa named by David Ross Robertson
Fish described in 1995
Fish of the Pacific Ocean